The following is a list of awards and nominations received by English actor Benedict Cumberbatch. He won the British Academy Television Award for Best Actor for his performance as the title character in Patrick Melrose. He earned six Primetime Emmy Award nominations, winning the Primetime Emmy Award for Outstanding Lead Actor in a Miniseries or a Movie for playing the role of Sherlock Holmes in Sherlock. He also received three Laurence Olivier Award nominations, winning the Laurence Olivier Award for Best Actor for Frankenstein. His portrayal of Alan Turing in The Imitation Game earned him an Academy Award nomination for Best Actor. In addition, he has received seven British Academy of Film and Television Arts nominations, five Screen Actors Guild Award nominations, and three Golden Globe Award nominations, among others. In 2014, Time magazine included him in its annual Time 100 as one of the "Most Influential People in the World". He was appointed Commander of the Order of the British Empire (CBE) by Queen Elizabeth II in June 2015, for his services to the performing arts and to charity. On 1 July 2018, Cumberbatch was awarded the Outstanding Achievement Award at The South Bank Sky Arts Awards.

Major awards

Academy Awards

BAFTA Awards

Critics' Choice Awards

Golden Globe Awards

Laurence Olivier Awards

Primetime Emmy Awards

Screen Actors Guild Awards

Toronto International Film Festival

Industry awards

AACTA Awards

British Independent Film Awards

Hollywood Film Awards

National Film Awards UK

Satellite Awards

Saturn Awards

Teen Choice Awards

Television awards

Crime Thriller Awards

Golden Nymph Awards

National Television Awards

Satellite Awards

TV Choice Awards

Theatre awards

Critics' Circle Theatre Awards

Evening Standard Theatre Awards

Ian Charleson Awards

Whatsonstage.com Awards

Film critics association awards

See also
List of Benedict Cumberbatch performances

References

Lists of awards received by British actor